Kildonan Lake is a lake located on Vancouver Island as an expansion of Cass Creek, north east of Uchucklesit Inlet.

References

Alberni Valley
Lakes of Vancouver Island
Clayoquot Land District